The 2000–01 National Professional Soccer League season was the seventeenth and final season for the league.

League standings

American Conference

National Conference

Playoffs

Scoring leaders
GP = Games Played, G = Goals, A = Assists, Pts = Points

League awards
 Most Valuable Player: Gino DiFlorio, Harrisburg
 Defender of the Year: Omid Namazi, Philadelphia
 Rookie of the Year: Nino Da Silva, Kansas City
 Goalkeeper of the Year: Victor Nogueira, Milwaukee & Pete Pappas, Philadelphia
 Coach of the Year: Richard Chinapoo, Harrisburg
 Finals MVP: Joe Reiniger, Milwaukee

All-NPSL Teams

All-Rookie Team

References
Major Indoor Soccer League II (RSSSF)

2000 in American soccer leagues
2000 in Canadian soccer
2001 in American soccer leagues
2001 in Canadian soccer
2000–01